Presidential Palace  is the residence for the President of Syria, located in Damascus. It is located in the West of the city, on Mount Mezzeh North of Mezzeh neighborhood, next to Mount Qasioun and overlooks the city. The main building covers 31,500 square metres (340,000 square feet). The entire plateau of Mount Mezzeh is part of the palace premises and is surrounded by a security wall and guard watchtowers. In front of the building is a large fountain and the palace itself largely consists of empty rooms clad in Carrara marble.

Although Japanese architect Kenzo Tange is credited with the design, he reputedly resigned from the project before construction of the palace began. The front brass gates were created by the noted Syrian-Jewish metalwork artist Maurice Nseiri.

The palace premises covers about 510,000 square meters (5,500,000 feet) and also includes a private presidential hospital and the headquarters of the Republican Guard. Hafez al-Assad first commissioned the plans for the building in 1979.
The building has been labelled as a form of "feudalistic architecture".

The palace is frequently used for hosting government delegations and foreign government visitors. On 27 October 1994, Bill Clinton met with Hafez al-Assad at the palace to negotiate a peace plan between Syria and Israel. Currently, the family of Bashar al-Assad lives in the residence, but they also occasionally reside at the older Tishreen Palace in the Ar Rabwah neighborhood.

References

Palaces in Syria
Government of Syria
Presidential residences
Buildings and structures completed in 1990
Buildings and structures in Damascus
1990 establishments in Syria